Novomogilyovsky is a rural locality (a khutor) in Shendzhyskoye Rural Settlement of Takhtamukaysky District, the Republic of Adygea, Russia. The population was 31 as of 2018. There are 2 streets.

Geography 
Novomogilyovsky is located 15 km south of Takhtamukay (the district's administrative centre) by road. Krasnoarmeysky is the nearest rural locality.

References 

Rural localities in Takhtamukaysky District